Murd (also Romanized as Mūrd; also known as Mūrd Sāmānī) is a village in Abezhdan Rural District, Abezhdan District, Andika County, Khuzestan Province, Iran. At the 2006 census, its population was 381, in 60 families.

References 

Populated places in Andika County